Mlaka is a small village off the road from Begunje na Gorenjskem to Tržič in the Municipality of Radovljica in the Upper Carniola region of Slovenia.

Geography
Mlaka lies on the southwest slope of Mount Dobrča. It is the smallest and lowest-elevation settlement among the four villages (Slatna, Srednja Vas, Zadnja Vas, and Mlaka) collectively known as Pod gorami (literally, 'below the mountains') on the slope.

References

External links

Mlaka at Geopedia

Populated places in the Municipality of Radovljica